Jarkko Malinen is a Finnish professional ice hockey player currently playing for KooKoo of the Finnish Liiga.

References

External links

Living people
KalPa players
1988 births
Finnish ice hockey forwards
Tappara players
KooKoo players
People from Kuopio
Sportspeople from North Savo